The 2017 Arnold Palmer Cup was a team golf competition held from June 9–11, 2017 at Atlanta Athletic Club in Johns Creek, Georgia, United States. The 21st playing of the event, it was the first since the death of namesake Arnold Palmer.

The score was level at 5 points each after the first day but the United States team won 9 of the 10 singles matches on the second day and halved the other. This gave them an overwhelming lead, needing just 1 point from 10 singles matches on the final day to win the match. The second set of singles was split 5–5, to give the United States a comfortable 19½–10½ victory in the match.

Format
On Friday, there were five matches of foursomes in the morning, followed by five four-ball matches in the afternoon. Ten singles matches were played on Saturday, and ten more on Sunday. In all, 30 matches were played.

Each of the 30 matches was worth one point in the larger team competition. If a match was all square after the 18th hole, each side earned half a point toward their team total. The team that accumulated at least 15½ points won the competition.

Teams
Ten college golfers from the United States and Europe participated in the event plus a non-playing head coach and assistant coach for each team.

The final place was allocated to the winner of the R&A Foundation Scholars Tournament. This was won by Stuart Grehan, who had already been selected for the team. Harry Hall was later selected as the final member of the team.

Friday's matches

Morning foursomes

Afternoon four-ball

Saturday's singles matches

Sunday's singles matches

Michael Carter award
The Michael Carter Award winners were David Wicks and Maverick McNealy.

References

External links
Arnold Palmer Cup official site

Arnold Palmer Cup
Golf in Georgia (U.S. state)
Arnold Palmer Cup
Arnold Palmer Cup
Arnold Palmer Cup
Arnold Palmer Cup